Stainby railway station was a station in Stainby, Lincolnshire, England. It was on a small, single-stop branch from Great Ponton which connected it to the Main Line and trains from the nearby town of Grantham.

References

Disused railway stations in Lincolnshire